Arizona's first election to the United States House of Representatives was held on Tuesday December 12, 1911, for the 62nd Congress.

Background
Arizona joined the union as the 48th state on February 14, 1912, having already elected its first Representative in December.  Arizona Territory had been formed in 1863 from the western half of New Mexico Territory, and originally included a portion of Nevada, until 1866.  From the time of its creation until statehood, the territory was represented in Congress by a delegate.  An early version of the Oklahoma Enabling Act also contained a clause for admitting Arizona Territory and New Mexico Territory as a single state, but that clause was removed in the final version.  Arizona was the last territory in the contiguous United States, and after Arizona's admission, it would be another 47 years before another State (Alaska) was admitted.

Election results

See also
 1911 United States House of Representatives elections
 62nd United States Congress

References

1911
Arizona
United States House of Representatives